Wongamine is a locality in the Wheatbelt region of Western Australia.

Located approximately 30 km from the nearby town of Goomalling and 19 km from Toodyay along Toodyay Road. The region comes under the jurisdiction of the Shire of Goomalling

Education
The locality had a primary school from 1876 until it shut down in 1945.  William Perrin taught at Buckland Primary School from 1871 to 1876 then Wongamine Primary School to 1900.  He was one of many ex-convict teachers.

Notable people
Notable people from or who have lived in Wongamine include:
 William Perrin, ticket of leave settler, and teacher
 Charles Dempster, politician, Western Australian Legislative Council

References

Towns in Western Australia
Wheatbelt (Western Australia)